The 1982 African Cup of Nations was the 13th edition of the Africa Cup of Nations, the association football championship of African nations run by the CAF. It was hosted by Libya. Just like in 1980, there were eight teams, which were split into two groups of four. Ghana won its fourth championship, beating Libya on penalty kicks 7−6 after a 1−1 draw.

Qualified teams 

The 8 qualified teams are:

 
 
 
 
  (host)
  (holders)

Squads

Venues 
The competition was played in two venues in Tripoli and Benghazi.

First round 
Teams highlighted in green progress to the Semi-finals.

Group A

Group B

Knockout stage

Semifinals

Third place match

Final

Top scorers 
4 goals

  George Alhassan

3 goals

  Ali Al-Beshari
  Peter Kaumba

2 goals

  Salah Assad
  Samuel Opoku Nti
  Stephen Keshi
  Godfrey Munshya

1 goal

  Chaabane Merzekane
  Djamel Zidane
  Grégoire Mbida
  John Essien
  Faraj Al-Barasi
  Fawzi Al-Issawi
  Abdel Razak Jaranah
  Ademola Adeshina
  Emmanuel Osigwe
  Aaron Njovu
  Kamel Gabsi

Own goal

  Peter Fregene (against Zambia)
  Okey Isima (against Algeria)
  Kamel Seddik (against Libya)

CAF Team of the Tournament

References

External links 
 Details at RSSSF
 Photographs of different ACN Finals (includes Libya 82)
 1982 African Cup of Nations on www.world-results.net
 1982 African Cup of Nations for football mundial

 
Nations
International association football competitions hosted by Libya
African Cup of Nations
Africa Cup of Nations tournaments
African Cup Of Nations